The teams competing in Group 4 of the 2013 UEFA European Under-21 Championship qualifying competition were Denmark, Faroe Islands, Macedonia, Northern Ireland, and Serbia.

Standings

Results and fixtures

Goalscorers
4 goals

 Nicklas Helenius
 Emil Larsen

3 goals

 Mads Albæk
 Samir Fazli
 Ilija Nestorovski
 Billy Kee

2 goals

 Anders Christiansen
 Andreas Laudrup
 Simon Makienok
 Róaldur Jakobsen
 Stefan Spirovski
 Josh Magennis
 Nemanja Gudelj
 Miloš Jojić
 Darko Lazović
 Filip Malbašić
 Saša Marković
 Luka Milunović

1 goal

 Rasmus Falk
 Erik Sviatchenko
 Goran Bogdanović
 Ferhan Hasani
 Aleksandar Stankov
 Flamur Tairi
 Filip Timov
 Yani Urdinov
 Nemanja Kojić
 Luka Milivojević
 Ognjen Mudrinski
 Matija Nastasić
 Nikola Ninković

1 own goal
 Kire Ristevski (playing against Faroe Islands)

References

External links
Standings and fixtures at UEFA.com

Group 4